Loan words in Sri Lankan Tamil came about mostly due contact between colonial powers and the native population. Linguists study a language's lexicon for a number of reasons. Languages such as Tamil with centuries of literature and multi-cultural contact offer the chance to compare the various processes of lexical change. The words of foreign origin or loanwords illustrate those processes: calques, loanwords, the distinction between function words and content words.

''Note: For information on the transcription used, see National Library at Calcutta romanization and Tamil script.

European contribution
Sri Lankan Tamil dialects are distinct from the Tamil dialects used in Tamil Nadu, India. They are used in Sri Lanka and in the Tamil diaspora. Linguistic borrowings from European colonizers such as the Portuguese, English and the Dutch have also contributed to a unique vocabulary that is distinct from the colloquial usage of Tamil in the Indian mainland. Furthermore, a form of Tamil spoken exclusively by Sri Lankan Moors has been strongly influenced by Arabic. Words that are peculiar to Sri Lankan Tamil dialects are marked with an asterisk (*).

Portuguese
Most Portuguese loan words are for items the native population lacked when the encounter happened c. 1505. Some are administrative terms, others are personal usage terms as well as items directly introduced from South America via the Portuguese traders. Most of these words are also shared with Sinhalese language users.

Dutch

English
Sri Lankan Tamil dialects use countless number of English words; following are some of the unique ones.

Civil conflict terminology
Black July induced civil conflict has introduced number of English and international words to the native population.

Sinhalese
Loanwords from the neighbouring Indo-European Sinhala are quite sparse in Sri Lankan Tamil (as opposed to the large number of Tamil loan words in Sinhala), which is most likely due to the relative isolation of the exclusively Tamil-speaking settlements in the North and East of the island.

Malay
There are also a few words from the Malay language. Malay words for edible fruits were introduced during the colonial period by traders . The same terminology is shared with Sinhalese.

Arabic
The Arabic language contributes a large number of words into a dialect form of Tamil that is spoken exclusively by ethnic Sri Lankan Moors.

See also
Sri Lanka Indo-Portuguese language
List of borrowed words in Indonesian

References
Portuguese cultural imprint in Sri Lanka
Tamil - A historical and linguistic perspective
Portuguese words in Sinhala

S
Sri Lankan Tamil society
Tamil
Tamil
Words
Tamil Sri Lanka